The 1961/62 season was the Royals 14th season in the NBA and its fifth in Cincinnati. Oscar Robertson had a career season as he averaged a triple double on the season. All 5 starters on the Royals averaged double digits points per games as the team ended a 4-year playoff drought. The Royals had a record of 43–37 and the improving team finished in 2nd place. Despite that, the NBA team had real local competition for fans in The Queen City due to remarkably successful college teams there. The starting five of the team had improved, with Bob Boozer improving to join solid holdovers Oscar Robertson, Jack Twyman, Wayne Embry, Arlen Bockhorn. In the playoffs, the Royals dealt with injuries and would be defeated by the Detroit Pistons in 4 games.

Roster

<noinclude>

Regular season

Season standings

Record vs. opponents

Game log

Playoffs

|- align="center" bgcolor="#ffcccc"
| 1
| March 16
| @ Detroit
| L 122–123
| Bockhorn, Robertson (24)
| Cobo Arena
| 0–1
|- align="center" bgcolor="#ccffcc"
| 2
| March 17
| Detroit
| W 129–107
| Oscar Robertson (33)
| Cincinnati Gardens
| 1–1
|- align="center" bgcolor="#ffcccc"
| 3
| March 18
| @ Detroit
| L 107–118
| Oscar Robertson (26)
| Cobo Arena
| 1–2
|- align="center" bgcolor="#ffcccc"
| 4
| March 20
| Detroit
| L 111–112
| Oscar Robertson (32)
| Cincinnati Gardens
| 1–3
|-

Player statistics

Regular season

Playoffs

Awards and honors
 Oscar Robertson, All-NBA First Team
 Oscar Robertson, NBA Leader, Assists, 899

References

 Royals on Basketball Reference

Sacramento Kings seasons
Cincinnati
Cincinnati
Cincinnati